The 23rd Annual British Academy Television Craft Awards were held on 24 April 2022, presented by the British Academy of Film and Television Arts (BAFTA) to recognize technical achievements in British television of 2021. The nominees were announced on 30 March 2022 alongside the nominations for the 2022 British Academy Television Awards.

Sky Atlantic miniseries Landscapers and Channel 4 comedy series We Are Lady Parts received the most awards with three wins each.

Winners and nominees
The nominees were announced on 30 March 2022.

See also
2022 British Academy Television Awards

References

External links
Official website

2022 television awards
2021 in British television
2022 in London
April 2022 events in the United Kingdom
2022
2022 awards in the United Kingdom